The São Paulo Macrometropolis, also known as Expanded Metropolitan Complex is a Brazilian megalopolis that emerged through the existing process of conurbation between the São Paulo's metropolitan areas located around the Greater São Paulo, with more than 30 million inhabitants, or 74 percent of São Paulo State's population, and is one of the most populous urban agglomerations in the world.

Beyond the Greater São Paulo, the megalopolis encompasses the metropolitan areas of Campinas, Santos, Sorocaba and the Paraíba Valley, and other nearby cities, which include urban agglomerations in the conurbation process, as Jundiaí and Piracicaba. The total population of these areas added to the state capital exceeds 31.5 million inhabitants, or about 75% of the population of the entire state of São Paulo.

The metropolitan complex is the only urban cluster (of agglomerations) of its kind in South America and covers an area of approximately 53 thousand square kilometers, connecting 174 municipalities and retains much of the industrial and economic output of the country.

Divisions

Biggest Municipalities

1,000,000+
São Paulo (São Paulo)(12,038,175)
Guarulhos (São Paulo)(1,337,087)
Campinas (Campinas)(1,173,370)

500,000–999,999
São Bernardo do Campo (São Paulo) (822,242)
São José dos Campos(Vale do Paraíba) (795,992)
Santo André (São Paulo) (712,749)
Osasco (São Paulo) (696,382)
Sorocaba (Sorocaba) (652,481)

200,000–499,999
Mauá (São Paulo) (457,696)
Santos (Baixada Santista) (434,359)
Mogi das Cruzes (São Paulo) (429,321)
Diadema (São Paulo) (415,180)
Jundiaí (Jundiaí) (405,740)
Carapicuíba (São Paulo) (394,465)
Piracicaba (Piracicaba) (394,419)
São Vicente (Baixada Santista) (357,989)
Itaquaquecetuba (São Paulo) (356,774)
Guarujá (Baixada Santista) (313,421)
Taubaté (Vale do Paraíba) (305,174)
Limeira (Piracicaba) (298,701)
Praia Grande (Baixada Santista) (304,705)
Suzano (São Paulo) (288,056)
Taboão da Serra (São Paulo) (275,948)
Sumaré (Campinas) (269,522)
Barueri (São Paulo) (264,935)
Embu das Artes (São Paulo) (264,448)
Indaiatuba (Campinas) (235,367)
Cotia (São Paulo) (233,696)
Americana (Campinas) (231,621)
Jacareí (Vale do Paraíba) (228,214)
Itapevi (São Paulo) (226,488)
Hortolândia (Campinas) (219,039)
Rio Claro (Piracicaba) (201,473)

100,000–199,999
Santa Bárbara d'Oeste (Campinas) (191,074)
Ferraz de Vasconcelos (São Paulo)(176,000)
Itu (Sorocaba) (170,157)
Bragança Paulista (Jundiaí) (164,000)
Itapetininga (Sorocaba) (160,000)
Itapecerica da Serra (São Paulo) (159,000)
Pindamonhangaba (Vale do Paraíba) (154,082)
Francisco Morato (Jundiaí) (155,000)
São Caetano do Sul (São Paulo) (151,000)
Mogi Guaçu (Campinas) (149,296)
Atibaia (Jundiaí) (139,683)
Franco da Rocha (Jundiaí) (129,000)
Cubatão (Baixada Santista) (127,000)
Valinhos (Campinas) (122,000)
Araras (Piracicaba) (121,282)
Votorantim (Sorocaba) (119,000)
Tatuí (Sorocaba) (118,000)
Várzea Paulista (Jundiaí) (116,000)
Salto (Sorocaba) (116,000)
Guaratinguetá (Vale do Paraíba) (114,000)
Itatiba (Jundiaí) (114,000)
Poá (São Paulo) (112,481)
Ribeirão Pires (São Paulo) (112,020)
Santana de Parnaíba (São Paulo) (111,000)
Jandira (São Paulo) (110,000)
Caraguatatuba (Vale do Paraíba) (107,000)
Itanhaém (Baixada Santista) (100,496)
Paulínia (Campinas) (100,000)

See also 
Megacity

Notes and references 

Metropolitan areas of São Paulo